Klasov is a village and municipality in the Nitra District in western central Slovakia, in the Nitra Region.

History
In historical records the village was first mentioned in 1232.

Geography
It has a population of about 1,210 people.

Ethnicity
The village is approximately 55% Slovak, 45% Magyar.

Facilities
The village has a public library and football pitch, and tennis pitch in Penzion Agroland.

See also
 List of municipalities and towns in Slovakia

References

Genealogical resources

The records for genealogical research are available at the state archive "Statny Archiv in Nitra, Slovakia"

 Roman Catholic church records (births/marriages/deaths): 1728-1913 (parish B)

External links
MOS - Městská a Obecní Statistika
Surnames of living people in Klasov

Villages and municipalities in Nitra District